Andrei Leonidovich Krasov (born January 27, 1967) is a Russian Airborne Troops Colonel and a Hero of the Russian Federation. He is currently the commander of Ryazan Guards Higher Airborne Command School.

Biography 
Andrei Krasov was born on January 27, 1967, in Zemlyanka, Orenburg Oblast of RSFSR. In 1988, he graduated from Ryazan Airborne Troops Institute. Andrei Krasov began his military service in the 106th Guards Airborne Division, where he served until getting the position of commander of airborne battalion.

After finishing Frunze Academy in 2005, Andrei Krasov became the commander of the 234th Guards airborne regiment. In 2008, he was deputy commander of the 76th Airborne Division.

Colonel Krasov participated in combat operations during 2008 Georgian campaign. During the war, he was a commander of one of the battalion tactical task forces. His battalion was in vanguard of Gori offensive  and engaged with Georgian 1st mechanized brigade. On August 13 they have captured Georgian military base nearby the city of Gori. On September 5, 2008, Andrei Krasov was awarded Hero of the Russian Federation.

In January 2010 he became the commander of Ryazan Airborne Troops Command School.

In September–October 2010 Krasov was criticised by Russian Defence Minister Anatoly Serdyukov for ordering the demolition of a small wooden church.

References 

Heroes of the Russian Federation
Recipients of the Order of Military Merit (Russia)
People of the Russo-Georgian War
1967 births
Living people
Frunze Military Academy alumni
United Russia politicians
21st-century Russian politicians
Ryazan Guards Higher Airborne Command School alumni
Sixth convocation members of the State Duma (Russian Federation)
Seventh convocation members of the State Duma (Russian Federation)
Eighth convocation members of the State Duma (Russian Federation)